DragonWave-X (formerly just DragonWave) is a multinational corporation headquartered in Ottawa, Ontario and a global supplier of packet microwave radio systems for mobile and access IP networks.

History 
Incorporated in February 2000, DragonWave introduced its first wireless broadband product in 2002.  

In 2007, the company saw the launch of its all-outdoor Horizon Compact microwave radio with transport speeds of 800Mbit/s.

DragonWave was first listed on the Toronto Stock Exchange in 2007,
and then listed on the NASDAQ exchange in 2009.

In 2011 DragonWave introduced two products, the Avenue and Horizon Compact+.

In October 2017 DragonWave was acquired by Transform-X, and was re-branded DragonWave-X.

Products
DragonWave designs and builds Ethernet microwave products to support existing and emerging backhaul requirements employing three key technologies: packet microwave, hybrid microwave and small cell solutions.

References 

Telecommunications companies of Canada
Manufacturing companies based in Ottawa
Companies formerly listed on the Toronto Stock Exchange
Companies formerly listed on the Nasdaq